Marinomonas balearica is a Gram-negative and aerobic bacterium from the genus of Marinomonas which has been isolated from seagrass Posidonia oceanica.

References

External links
Type strain of Marinomonas balearica at BacDive -  the Bacterial Diversity Metadatabase

Oceanospirillales
Bacteria described in 2010